Bremerhaven (Low German: Bremerhoben) is a city at the seaport of the Free Hanseatic City of Bremen, a state of the Federal Republic of Germany. 

It forms a semi-enclave in the state of Lower Saxony and is located at the mouth of the Weser on its eastern bank, opposite the town of Nordenham. Though a relatively new city, it has a long history as a trade port and today is one of the most important German ports, playing a role in Germany's trade.

Wesermünde was a neighboring city created in 1924 through the merger of Geestemünde and Lehe. In 1939, Bremerhaven was incorporated into Wesermünde, but in 1947 the cities were collectively renamed as Bremerhaven and returned to the Free Hanseatic City of Bremen.

History 

The town was founded in 1827, but neighboring settlements such as Lehe were in the vicinity as early as the 12th century, and   Geestendorf was "mentioned in documents of the ninth century". These tiny villages were built on small islands in the swampy estuary. In 1381, the city of Bremen established de facto rule over the lower Weser stream, including Lehe, later therefore called Bremerlehe. Early in 1653, Swedish Bremen-Verden's troops captured Bremerlehe by force.

The Emperor Ferdinand III ordered his vassal Christina of Sweden, then Duchess regnant of Bremen-Verden, to restitute Bremerlehe to Bremen. However, Swedish Bremen-Verden began the First Bremian War (March – July 1654). In the subsequent peace treaty (November 1654) Bremen had to cede Bremerlehe and its surroundings to Swedish Bremen-Verden. The latter developed plans to found a fortified town on the site, and much later this location became the present-day city of Bremerhaven.  In 1672, under the reign of Charles XI of Sweden, in personal union Duke of Bremen-Verden—colonists tried unsuccessfully to erect a castle (named Carlsburg after Charles XI) there; this fortified structure was meant to protect, as well as control shipping heading for Bremen.

Finally, in 1827, the city of Bremen under Burgomaster Johann Smidt bought the territories at the mouth of the Weser from the Kingdom of Hanover. Bremen sought this territory to retain its share of Germany's overseas trade, which was threatened by the silting up of the Weser around the old inland port of Bremen. Due to trade with, and emigration to North America, the port and the town grew quickly. In 1848, Bremerhaven became the home port of the German Confederation's Navy under Karl Rudolf Brommy.

The Kingdom of Hanover founded a rival town next to Bremerhaven and called it Geestemünde (1845). Both towns grew and established the three economic pillars of trade, shipbuilding and fishing. Following inter-state negotiations at different times, Bremerhaven's boundary was several times extended at the expense of Hanoverian territory. In 1924, Geestemünde and the neighbouring municipality of Lehe were united to become the new city of Wesermünde, and in 1939 Bremerhaven (apart from the overseas port) was removed from the jurisdiction of Bremen and made a part of Wesermünde, then a part of the Prussian Province of Hanover.

Bremerhaven was one of the important harbours of emigration in Europe.

As possibly the most critical North Sea base of the Kriegsmarine, 79% of the city was destroyed in the Allied air bombing of Bremen in World War II; however, key parts of the port were deliberately spared by the Allied forces to provide a usable harbour for supplying the Allies after the war. All of Wesermünde, including those parts which did not previously belong to Bremerhaven, was a postwar enclave run by the United States within the British zone of northern Germany. Most of the US military units and their personnel were assigned to the city's Carl Schurz Kaserne. One of the longest based US units at the Kaserne was a US military radio and TV station, an "Amerikanischer Soldatensender", AFN Bremerhaven, which broadcast for 48 years. In 1993, the Kaserne was vacated by the US military and returned to the German government.

In 1947 the city became part of the federal state Free Hanseatic City of Bremen and was consequently renamed from Wesermünde to Bremerhaven. Today, Bremerhaven is a city in its own right, but also part of the city-state of Bremen, which is for all intents and purposes a state comprising two cities. In addition to being part of the federal state, the city of Bremen has owned the "overseas port" within Bremerhaven since 1927. This and other parts of Bremerhaven owned by the city of Bremen are known as stadtbremisch. To complicate matters, a treaty between the two cities (as mentioned in Section 8 of Bremerhaven's municipal constitution) makes Bremerhaven responsible for the municipal administration of those parts owned directly by Bremen.

Trade 

The container terminal is situated on the bank of the river Weser opening to the North Sea. In the wet dock parts, accessible by two large locks, more than 2 million cars are imported or exported every year with 2,3 million in 2014. Bremerhaven imports and exports more cars than any other city in Europe. Another million tons of "High-and-Heavy" goods are handled with ro-ro ships. In 2011 a new panamax-sized lock has replaced the 1897 Kaiserschleuse, then the largest lock worldwide.

Climate 
Bremerhaven has a temperate maritime climate; severe frost and heat waves with temperatures above  are rare. Snow does fall in winter and early spring and, more rarely, in autumn. However, it usually doesn't stay on the ground for long.

Transport

Roads 
Due to its unique geographic situation, Bremerhaven suffers from a few transportational difficulties. The city has been connected to the autobahn network since the late 1970s. The A 27 runs north–south, east of the city, connecting Bremerhaven to Bremen and Cuxhaven. Road connections to Hamburg, however, are poor. The Bundesstraße 71 and secondary roads therefore carry most of the heavy lorry traffic. A proposed solution is the construction of the A 22, the so-called Küstenautobahn (or "coastal motorway"), which would link Bremerhaven to Hamburg and Wilhelmshaven/Oldenburg (using the Weser tunnel). Roads leading to the overseas port are regularly overloaded with freight traffic, and solutions are presently being discussed, including a deep-cut road favoured by the city government and various interest groups.

Railway 
Bremerhaven has three active passenger rail stations, Bremerhaven Hauptbahnhof in the city centre, Bremerhaven-Lehe north of the centre and Bremerhaven-Wulsdorf in the southern part of the city. All three stations are served by hourly Bremen S-Bahn trains on the line RS 2 as well as regional services to Cuxhaven and Buxtehude on the line RB 33. 
Additionally, Bremerhaven Hauptbahnhof is served by regional express trains to Hanover (RE 8) and Osnabrück (RE 9) and was reconnected to Deutsche Bahn's Intercity network in late 2021, after nearly 20 years without long-distance rail services in the city.

A fourth station, Bremerhaven-Speckenbüttel near the border to Langen, has been out of service since 1988. Apart from passenger traffic, the railways in Bremerhaven carry a heavy load of freight traffic from and to the seaport, mostly new cars, containers and food.

Tram 

Bremerhaven owned a tram from 1881 to 1982.
In the heyday, 1949, there were 6 lines. The last line was the 2 from the north of the city to the main train station. The tram was shut down on July 30, 1982.

Bus 
Bremerhaven has 2020 a bus network with 19 bus lines operated by BREMERHAVEN BUS. Two of the bus lines are night lines that only go on weekends. In addition, there is the so-called Schnellbus-Line S, which serves selected stops and is therefore faster. BREMERHAVEN BUS operates up to 87 regular buses through the company Verkehrsgesellschaft Bremerhaven AG (VGB). There are numerous regional buses operated by other companies that depart from Bremerhaven Central Station, to Bad Bederkesa, Beverstedt, Hagen, Nordholz and Otterndorf. In addition, Bremerhaven is also served by buses from Flixbus.

Tourist attractions 

Bremerhaven has only a few historical buildings, and the high street and city centre are almost entirely post-war. The Bremerhaven Zoo reopened on 27 March 2004, after a lengthy renovation. It features Arctic wildlife, both terrestrial and marine. The latest addition is the Klimahaus from 2009, simulating travel adventure along the 8th line of longitude and dealing with climate issues. Two gazebos can be found on top of the Atlantic Hotel Sail City and the Radar Tower. Another tourist spot is the Fischereihafen (fishing port) in Geestemünde which also houses an aquarium (the Atlanticum). The Lloyd Werft shipyard is renowned for building and renovating large cruise liners, for example Norway.

Every five years Sail Bremerhaven is held, a large sailing convention that attracts tall ships from all over the world. The last time it was held was in 2015 with over 270 vessels and 3,500 crew members. In 2011 Bremerhaven set the record for the largest ever parade of boats, with 327 vessels in the parade. This record was broken in 2012 by the Thames Diamond Jubilee Pageant, with 1,000 boats.

The passenger terminal Columbuskaje, built at the Weser bank in 1927 to avoid time-absorbing locking, has been transferred into a cruise terminal (Columbus Cruise Center Bremerhaven/CCCB). Also three marinas are available, the latest accessible through a new lock at Neuer Hafen.

Population

Politics 
Bremerhaven has a city council with 49 members. It also elects 15 members of the Bürgerschaft of Bremen.

Sport 

The Fischtown Pinguins, also known as REV Bremerhaven, are a professional ice hockey team in the DEL, Germany's top ice hockey league.

Eisbären Bremerhaven (Polar Bears), founded 2001, is a basketball team playing in the German second-tier level league ProA.

The American Football team is the Bremerhaven Seahawks which play in the German Regio Nord of the 3rd League. The Seahawks are the second oldest team in Germany.

Local association football clubs are Leher TS, SFL Bremerhaven and until 2012 FC Bremerhaven. TSV Wulsdorf and OSC Bremerhaven also have a football teams but as part of a multi-sport club.

Research and education 

Bremerhaven is home to the Alfred Wegener Institute, a national research institute which is concerned with maritime sciences and climate and keeps a number of research vessels, amongst them the heavy research icebreaker RV Polarstern. It also runs the Neumayer-Station III in the Antarctic.

The Fraunhofer Society  maintains research laboratories in Bremerhaven for development and testing of Wind Power components.

The German Maritime Museum is part of the German Leibniz Association.

The  (Hochschule Bremerhaven) was founded in 1975 and is expanding since with more than 3.000 students in 2009. The university is attended by a large number of overseas students from all over the world. Among the courses offered are Process Engineering, Information Technology and the BA Entrepreneurship, Innovation, Leadership programme, the first programme modelled after the Finnisch Team Academy format in a German language higher education institution.

Twin towns – sister cities

Bremerhaven is twinned with:

 Cherbourg-en-Cotentin, France (1960)
 Grimsby, North East Lincolnshire, England, UK (1963)
 Pori, Finland (1969)
 Frederikshavn, Denmark (1979)
 Szczecin, Poland (1990)
 Kaliningrad, Russia (1992)

The three roads connecting the city of Bremerhaven to the Autobahn 27 consequently are named after the original three twin towns:
 Cherbourger Straße (AS Bremerhaven-Überseehafen)
 Grimsbystraße (AS Bremerhaven-Mitte)
 Poristraße (AS Bremerhaven-Geestemünde)

In addition to that, there are also streets which earlier had been named after Szczecin (Stettiner Straße) and Kaliningrad (Königsberger Straße).

Notable people

 Hans Joachim Alpers (1943–2011), writer and editor of science fiction and fantasy
 Lale Andersen (1905–1972), singer and actress, sang WW2 song "Lili Marleen"
 Roger Asmussen (1936–2015), politician (CDU), German Minister of Economy and Transport in 1987
 Uwe Beckmeyer (born 1949), politician (SPD)
 Adolf Butenandt (1903–1995), biochemist
 Jeanne Córdova (1948–2016), American pioneer lesbian and gay rights activist
 Jenny Dolfen (born 1975), illustrator and teacher
 Volker Engel (born 1965), visual effects supervisor and producer
 Heino Ferch (born 1963), actor
 Wolfgang Gaede (1878–1945), physicist and pioneer of vacuum engineering
 Johanna Goldschmidt (1807–1884), social activist, writer and philanthropist
 Werner Grübmeyer (1926-2018), politician 
 Corinna Harney (born 1972), German-American model and actress
 Carl Hermann (1898–1961), professor of crystallography
 Christoph Maria Herbst (born 1966), actor and comedian at Stadttheater Bremerhaven 1992–1996
 Carola Höhn (1910–2005), stage and movie actress
 Eberhard Jäckel (1929–2017), historian, studied role of Adolf Hitler in German history
 Lou Jacobs (1903–1992), American clown and entertainer
 Erich Koch-Weser (1875–1944), lawyer and politician
 Sigrid Lorenzen Rupp (1943–2004), German-American architect
 Norman Paech (born 1938), university professor and politician (The Left)
 Johannes Piersig (1907–1998), Kantor, docent af music educator
 Betty Schade (1895–1982), German-born American actress of the silent era
 Hans Joachim Schliep (born 1945), Lutheran theologian, pastor and author
 André Werner (born 1960), composer of classical music
 Anders Levermann (born 1973), environmental scientist and climatologist
 Felix Magath (born 1953), football player and coach
 Herta Müller (born 1953), writer and Nobel Prize for Literature 2009, 1989 Scholarship in Bremerhaven
 Stephan Remmler (born 1946), grew up in Bremerhaven, singer, composer and music producer
 Willi Reimann (born 1949), former footballer at TuS Bremerhaven 93, football coach
 Karl-Georg Saebisch (1903–1984), German-language theater, film and television actor, director and honorary member of the Municipal Theatre Bremerhaven
 Hans Scharoun (1893–1972), grew up in Bremerhaven, architect and exponent of organic architecture
 Gottfried Semper (1803–1879), architect, volunteer at the port construction 
 Wolfgang Wippermann (born 1945), historian
 Helmut Yström (1881–1963), politician, Senator in Bremen, 1945–1948, local chief of police

Sport
 Bernd Brexendorf (born 1954), footballer and doctor
 Egon Coordes (born 1944), football player and trainer
 Hendrik Feldwehr (born 1986), swimmer
 Eduard Pendorf (1892–1958), footballer
 Walter Schmidt (born 1937), footballer
 Clemens Schoppenhauer (born 1992), footballer
 Tomas Seyler (born 1974), darts player
 Esra Sibel Tezkan (born 1993), Turkish-German footballer
 Lars Toborg (born 1975), football player

References and notes

External links 

 Auswandererhaus
 Deutsches Schiffahrtsmuseum (in German)
 Hochschule Bremerhaven (in English)
 Alfred Wegener Institut (in English)
 360 QTVR Panos
 Fullscreen panos
 German Naval Base Bremerhaven 1939–45
 20th century timetables

 
Enclaves and exclaves
Populated coastal places in Germany (North Sea)
Port cities and towns in Germany
Port cities and towns of the North Sea
1827 establishments in Bremen